The Macau Black Bears are a Macanese professional basketball team competing in the ASEAN Basketball League (ABL).

History
Chong Son Kung Fu was a Chinese basketball team playing in the ASEAN Basketball League. Based in Nanhai District, Foshan, Guangdong, the team plays their home games at the 4,000-seated Nanhai Gymnasium. They joined ABL from 2017–18 season as the "Nanhai Long Lions". They changed their name to Nanhai Kung Fu to differentiate themselves from their mother team, the Guanzhou Long Lions. After they partnered with Macau's Grupo Desportivo Chong Son they changed their name once again to their present name by November 2017.

After the 2018 season, the team relocated to Macau to become the Macau Black Bears, in a bid to promote professional basketball in the city. The name was derived Bobo the Black Bear, an individual Asian black bear who first came to public attention in the 1980s when it was rescued from being cooked in a gourmet restaurant as a cub.

The inaugural season was led by General Manager Lukas Peng.

Players

Current roster

Head coaches
  Charles Dubé-Brais (2017–2018, 2023–present)
  Mu Jianxin (2018–2019)
  Charles Hantoumakos (2019–2020)

Season-by-season record

Affiliates
 Guangzhou Loong Lions

References

External links
 Chongson Kung Fu web page at the ABL official website

ASEAN Basketball League teams
Sports teams in Guangdong
Foshan
Basketball teams established in 2017
2017 establishments in China
Black Bears